This article lists the heads of state of Fiji, from the establishment of the Kingdom of Fiji in 1871 to the present day.

Currently, the head of state of Fiji is the president of the republic, appointed by the Parliament for a three-year term under the terms of the Constitution of 2013.

The current president is Ratu Wiliame Katonivere. He was elected on 22 October 2021, and sworn in on 12 November 2021.

Tui Viti (King of Fiji) (1871–1874)

Note that Cakobau had been the Vunivalu (Warlord/Paramount Chief) of Bau since 1852. He had long styled himself the Tui Viti (King of Fiji), but had not been recognized as such by other chiefs, and he exercised no direct authority outside his domain of Bau until he united the country under his leadership in 1871. His ancestors, going back as far as 1770, have often – erroneously – been listed as "Kings" of Fiji.

British period (1874–1970)

On 10 October 1874, Cakobau signed the Deed of Cession, that granted the British Empire sovereignty over the islands. From 1874 to 1970, the British monarch was Fiji's formal head of state.

Governors

The British monarch was represented by a governor, who acted on the advice of the British government.

Queen of Fiji (1970–1987)

Fiji became an independent Commonwealth realm on 10 October 1970, and Elizabeth II assumed the role of Queen of Fiji.

Governors-general

The Queen of Fiji was represented by a governor-general, who acted on the advice of the Fijian government.

Presidents (1987–present)

Fiji was proclaimed a republic on 7 October 1987, upon the deposition of the Fijian monarchy following two military coups.

Timeline

See also
 Monarchy of Fiji
 President of Fiji
 Prime Minister of Fiji

References

Fiji, Heads of State
Heads of state
Heads of state
Heads of State
Heads of state of Fiji
1871 establishments in Fiji